Demarre is a given name.  Notable people with the name include:

DeMarre Carroll (born 1986), American basketball player
Demarre McGill (born 1975), American classical musician

See also
DeMar, given name and surname
Dermarr, given name

Masculine given names